Nordic most commonly refers to:
 Nordic countries, written in plural as Nordics, the northwestern European countries, including Scandinavia, Fennoscandia and the North Atlantic
 Scandinavia, a cultural, historical and ethno-linguistic region in northern Europe
 a native of Northern Europe
 Nordic or North Germanic languages

Nordic may also refer to:

Synonym for Scandinavian or Norse
 Nordic Bronze Age, a period and a Bronze Age culture in Scandinavian pre-history
 Nordic folklore
 Nordic mythology
 Nordic paganism

Relating to a racial category
 Nordic race, a race group
 Nordic theory or Nordicism, the belief that Northern Europeans constitute a "master race", a theory which influenced Adolf Hitler.
 Nordic League, a far right organisation in the United Kingdom from 1935 to 1939
 Nordic aliens, a group of supposed humanoid extraterrestrial beings whose appearance resembles the Nordic physical type

Sports
 Bidding system for Contract bridge
 Nordic combined, a winter sport in which athletes compete in both cross-country skiing and ski jumping
 Nordic skiing, a winter sport that encompasses all types of skiing where the heel of the boot cannot be fixed to the ski, as opposed to Alpine skiing
 Nordic walking, a physical activity and a sport consisting of walking with poles similar to ski poles
 Nordic Figure Skating Championships, an annual invitational elite figure skating competition, open only to skaters from Nordic countries
 Quebec Nordiques, an ice hockey team

Places
 Nordic, Wyoming, a census-designated place in the United States

Other uses
 Nordic Catholic Church, a church body in Norway of High Church Lutheran origin, under the auspices of the Polish National Catholic Church
 Nordic (tug), a German emergency tow vessel
 Nordic model, the economic and social policies common to the Nordic countries
 Nordic Semiconductor, a fabless semiconductor company
 Nordic race, a race from the fictional Elder Scrolls game series
 a 6-rowed feed barley variety
 THQ Nordic, a video game development company
 Nordic the Incurable, pen name of Finnish journalist Risto Hieta

See also
 
 Norse (disambiguation)
 Norden (disambiguation)
 North, a noun, adjective, or adverb indicating direction or geography
 Nordicity, a Canadian term used to designate "degree of northerliness"
 Nordisk (disambiguation)